The 36th World Orienteering Championships were held in Østfold, Norway in August 2019.

From 2019 the world championships are split in two (forest and park), each being held every second year. The 2019 edition is a pure "forest" format. The competitions are the middle and long distances, and relay.

Schedule

Medal summary

Men

Women

Results

Men's long distance

Women's long distance

Women's middle final

Men's middle final

References

External links
Official website

World Orienteering Championships
2019 in Norwegian sport
International sports competitions hosted by Norway
World Orienteering Championships
Orienteering in Norway
2019 in orienteering